Jam Zone was a 3-hour long Video block that was created in 1997 on BET. It aired Monday to Fridays during the midday.  In 1999, A virtual reality character, Cita, became the hostess of the show. In 1999, the show's name was changed to Cita's World.  It ended in 2003.

BET original programming
1990s American music television series
2000s American music television series
1997 American television series debuts
2000 American television series endings